Linnanmäki (colloquially Lintsi) is an amusement park in Helsinki, Finland. It was opened on 27 May 1950 and is owned by the non-profit Children's Day Foundation, which operates the park in order to raise funds for Finnish child welfare work.

Linnanmäki is the oldest and most popular amusement park in Finland. It has many rides of different types and sizes, and of the all Nordic amusement parks, Linnanmäki has the most rides in relation to the number of visitors. It also has other attractions, including arcades, games, kiosks, restaurants and an outdoor stage on which different performers appear in the summer. The park is open from spring to autumn and is visited by over a million guests annually. In August 2006, Linnanmäki received its fifty-millionth visitor.

History 

In 1950, six Finnish child welfare organisations leased an area from the city of Helsinki for an initial period of three years in the middle of a recreational area consisting of two parks, where they set up an amusement park. The city extended the lease in 1953 and leased  for the amusement park. In 1957, the welfare organisations established the non-profit Children's Day Foundation, which continues to maintain and develop the amusement park.

Linnanmäki is built on a hill and derives its name from Vesilinnanmäki, the name locals gave to the hilly area in the early 20th century since it had two water towers, built in 1876 and 1938, respectively. The water towers are no longer in operation and were disconnected from the grid in 2003. However, the towers are protected by the zoning plan of the city and cannot be demolished. In the future, it is hoped that the towers will be used year-round to support amusement park activities. The older, angular tower near the perimeter of the amusement park—the oldest water tower in Helsinki—currently houses the park's maintenance and storage facilities, while the newer, cylindrical tower dominating the park and its wider surroundings houses an indoor roller coaster called Linnunrata eXtra.

Since its opening in 1950, two people have died in amusement ride accidents at Linnanmäki, both caused by negligence on the part of the rider. In 1953, an employee, a roller coaster brakeman who was sitting in the front row after his shift on the last ride of the evening did not attach the safety bar, fell off and was hit by the train. In 1985, a guest, a boy, also sitting in the front row, had managed to open the safety bar and stood up to wave to his friends. The boy then fell in front of the train, which ran over him.

The park 

The hill where the park is located has a nice view of the city. The park has no discernible theming and feels relatively compact and densely packed; the rides and attractions are in close proximity to one another. In addition to the amusement rides and attractions the park also contains the Peacock, a historical theatre built in 1957 and known for its musical productions. In addition to the park itself, guests can also visit the Sea Life aquarium, the only Sea Life centre in the Nordic countries, opened in 2002.

The park is open from April to October, while the theatre and aquarium are operational throughout the year. The park also featured Linnanmäen museo from 1996 to 2005, a museum facility which located next to the park's main entrance and housed several exhibitions every year.

The park is easily reached from the city centre by tram lines 3, 8, 9, and bus line 23.

Rides and attractions 
Linnanmäki currently has 43 rides, along with many other non-ride based attractions. The most notable ride in the park is Vuoristorata, a wooden roller coaster, opened in 1951. It is the most recognisable symbol of the park, and was one of the first permanent rides to be built at the park. Technically the oldest ride at Linnanmäki is Karuselli (a carousel), which was built in Germany in 1896 and has been at Linnanmäki since 1954.

Linnanmäki has eight roller coasters. Other major rides include three tower rides, a ferris wheel, a river rapids ride and spinning rides. The park also has a selection of family and kiddie rides.

Admission to the park is free, and most of the rides can only be ridden with the possession of a ride ticket, or the more popular wristband, which allows the wearer unlimited access to all of the park's rides for the entire day. , the wristband costs the same for each customer, regardless of height.

Linnanmäki also hosts various events and festivals every year, such as the popular iik!week Horror Festival and traditional Carnival of Light (Valokarnevaali), which are both held in the autumn.

Mermaid hall 

Vedenneitohalli (English: Mermaid hall) was one of Linnanmäki's most popular attractions in 1951–1980. Young female mermaid performers, dressed in swimsuits, would lie down on a platform above a pool behind a net. For a fee, visitors tried to hit a release button on a pole at the front of the net with a ball. When the ball hit the target, a lock at the top of the platform would open and the mermaid performer would fall into the water. In the 1970s, men were also being dropped after a women's organisation drew attention to the issue in the name of equality.

Naisasialiitto Unioni, a Finnish women's organisation, considered the hall to be a demeaning place for women and in 1978 sent a letter to Linnanmäki's management. As a result, the hall was closed in 1980.

Current rides

Roller coasters

Major rides

Family rides

Kiddie rides

Attractions

Rides under construction

Removed rides and attractions

Gallery of images

References

External links 

  
 20th Spinning Coaster set for Linnanmäki in 2008
 Photographs and video from Linnanmäki's major rides

 
1950 establishments in Finland
Amusement parks in Finland
Parks in Helsinki
Amusement parks opened in 1950